This article refers to crime in the U.S. state of Hawaii.

Statistics
In 2008, there were 49,516 crimes reported in Hawaii, including 25 murders, 46,004 property crimes, and 365 rapes.

Capital punishment laws
Capital punishment is not applied in this state.

References